Zoran Nikolić (born 23 February 1991) is a Serbian handball player for HC Dobrogea Sud and the Serbia national team.

Career
After playing for PKB, Nikolić signed with Radnički Kragujevac in 2011. He spent two seasons with the club, before transferring to Vojvodina in 2013. After winning three consecutive Serbian Handball Super League titles, Nikolić moved abroad to Romanian club Dobrogea Sud Constanța in 2016.

A Serbia international since 2016, Nikolić participated at the 2019 World Men's Handball Championship and 2020 European Men's Handball Championship.

Honours
Vojvodina
 Serbian Handball Super League: 2013–14, 2014–15, 2015–16
 Serbian Handball Cup: 2014–15

References

External links
 EHF record

1991 births
Living people
Handball players from Belgrade
Serbian male handball players
RK Vojvodina players
Expatriate handball players
Serbian expatriate sportspeople in Romania